The siege of Metz (17 January – 10 April 1814) was a siege of the French city of Metz during the War of the Sixth Coalition at the end of the Napoleonic Wars. It pitted French forces under General Pierre François Joseph Durutte against Prussian, Russian and Hessian troops commanded by the Russian General Dimitri Mikhailovich Youzefovitch. The allied force began the siege on 17 January 1814 and eventually lifted it on 10 April the same year, without having taken the city.

Course
After the German campaign, Napoleon's army retreated onto French soil. From November 1813 the wounded from the Grande Armée were sent to Metz and soon its hospitals were at saturation point - the military hospital at Fort Moselle alone took in more than 1,800 men, whilst Metz's town hall, its new lycée, its 'grand séminaire' (great seminary) and most of its churches were all transformed into field hospitals. The city soon also had to house 30,000 men.

The siege began on 3 January and by 17 January the city was fully blockaded. Based at Ars-sur-Moselle, Youzefovitch commanded an allied force of Prussians and Russians. He sent parties dangerously close to the city's fortifications to test its weak points, but little by little the blockade loosened, allowing the French to leave the besieged city. Durutte even managed to send out a diversionary expedition near the city, executing a pivoting manoeuvre from Sarrelouis to Verdun, passing Thionville, Longwy and Montmédy. Returning to Metz, Durutte learned of Napoleon I's abdication. By now the siege was merely nominal and it was officially lifted on 10 April.

Notes

References

Further reading

External links

Battles of the War of the Sixth Coalition
Sieges of the Napoleonic Wars
Sieges involving France
Sieges involving Prussia
Sieges involving Russia
Conflicts in 1814
January 1814 events
February 1814 events
March 1814 events
April 1814 events
1814 in France
Siege